Philip Wharton, 3rd Baron Wharton (1555–1625) was an English peer of the Wharton barony. Wharton was named after his godfather, Philip II of Spain.

Life

He inherited the title of Baron when he was 17 years old, and he owned land in Grisedale.

In August 1594 he travelled with the Earl of Sussex to Stirling Castle for ceremonies and masques at the christening of Prince Henry of Scotland.

Notable in his life was his entertaining King James in 1617 which, as was common in those days, nearly bankrupted him. In 1618 his debts amounted to £16,713 on an annual income of £2,107.

Personal life

Wharton was married twice, first to Frances Clifford, second daughter of Henry Clifford, 2nd Earl of Cumberland, in 1577. She died in 1592 and about 1597 he married Dorothy Colby (d. 1621). He had two sons by Frances Clifford (1) Sir George who married Lady Anne Manners, daughter of John Manners, 4th Earl of Rutland, and was killed in a duel without issue, and (2) Thomas of Aske who died in 1622. Therefore, neither son inherited the barony which was passed to Philip, the eldest son of Sir Thomas.

Death
Wharton died in 1625 and was buried at Healaugh.

References

1555 births
1625 deaths
16th-century English nobility
17th-century English nobility
Barons Wharton